Los Humildes are a Mexican Grupero band from Modesto, California. Their music has been a staple in the lives of many Mexicans and Mexican-Americans for many decades. They received a Grammy Award nomination for Best Mexican-American performance in 1986 for their album 13 Aniversario.

References

1972 establishments in California